Jason Jamar Allen (born July 5, 1983) is a former American football cornerback. He was drafted by the Miami Dolphins 16th overall of the 2006 NFL Draft. He played college football at Tennessee. Allen also played for the Houston Texans and Cincinnati Bengals.

High school career
Allen earned various honors while playing football at Muscle Shoals High School in Muscle Shoals, Alabama. He was named an All-American from SuperPrep, PrepStar and Borderwars.com. He was twice a 5A All-State running back and was once selected as the Alabama Gatorade Player of the Year. As a senior, he ran for 1,740 yards and 21 touchdowns while adding 378 yards and three scores receiving. His performance earned him the honor of being the No. 1 player in Alabama by Birmingham News and Mobile Register.

Allen also lettered in track and basketball at Muscle Shoals. He graduated early in January 2001.

College career
Allen was a four-year letterman and three-year starter for the Tennessee Volunteers. He appeared in 43 games with 26 starting, including 12 starts at safety and 14 at cornerback.

2002
By graduating in January, Allen was able to attend spring practices at the University of Tennessee. He went on to play in 13 games as a true freshman in 2002, finishing with five tackles.

2003
As a starting cornerback in 2003, Allen starter eight of the 13 games in which he appeared and amassed 57 tackles (43 solo), a forced fumble, two interceptions, 11 passes defensed and a blocked kick. His first career interception sealed a win against Marshall. His breakout came against the University of Alabama, when he had 12 tackles, a blocked field goal and two pass breakups including the game-sealing one on fourth-and-two in the fifth overtime.

2004
Allen started the first game of the season at cornerback before moving to safety for the final 12 contests. He finished with 123 tackles which led the SEC while also becoming the first non-linebacker to lead the team in tackles since records began in 1970. His 88 solo stops were third in the entire nation among Division I-A schools. Along with his tackles, he totaled two sacks, three forced fumbles, a fumble recovery, two interceptions and seven passes defensed during the year.

For his performance during the season, Allen was a third-team Associated Press All-America selection, second-team All-SEC Coaches and Associated Press selection, Jim Thorpe Award semifinalist. He also earned Walter Camp Division I-A Defensive Player of the Week honors on October 23.

2005
Allen suffered a season-ending dislocated hip in the fifth game of the season in 2005 while tackling University of Georgia tight end Leonard Pope. Prior to the injury, he recorded 35 tackles (28 solo) with a 10-yard sack, three stops for losses, a forced fumble and deflected two passes.

Professional career

Miami Dolphins
Allen was drafted by the Miami Dolphins in the first round with the 16th overall pick in the 2006 NFL Draft. He was selected by then-head coach Nick Saban, who faced Allen while head coach at Louisiana State. Saban also unsuccessfully recruited Allen out of high school while at LSU.

Jason Allen was released by the Dolphins on November 10, 2010.

Houston Texans
Allen was claimed off waivers by the Houston Texans on November 11, 2010.

Cincinnati Bengals
Allen signed with the Cincinnati Bengals on March 17, 2012.

Jason Allen was released by the Cincinnati Bengals on April 10, 2013.

References

External links

Tennessee Volunteers bio

1983 births
Living people
People from Muscle Shoals, Alabama
Players of American football from Alabama
American football cornerbacks
American football safeties
Tennessee Volunteers football players
Miami Dolphins players
Houston Texans players
Cincinnati Bengals players